Lehchevo is a village in Boychinovtsi Municipality of Montana Province, northwestern Bulgaria. It has a population of about 2,000 people. It is located on the left bank of the Ogosta river.

The only means of transportation linking Lehchevo to other villages and towns nearby is the bus transport system.

External links 
 https://web.archive.org/web/20101127162353/http://lehchevo.eu/

Villages in Montana Province